Lepidophora lepidocera, the scaly bee fly, is a species of bee flies in the family of Bombyliidae.

References

External links

 

Bombyliidae
Articles created by Qbugbot
Insects described in 1828